The 1987 Atlantic 10 men's basketball tournament was held from February 27 to March 5, 1987. Temple defeated West Virginia 70-57 to win their second tournament championship. Nate Blackwell of Temple was named the Most Outstanding Player of the tournament.

Bracket

* - Overtime

References

External links
  Atlantic 10 Men's Basketball Tournament History 

Atlantic 10 men's basketball tournament
Tournament
Atlantic 10 men's basketball tournament
Atlantic 10 men's basketball tournament
Atlantic 10 men's basketball tournament
Basketball in Philadelphia